Čekrčići is a village in the municipality of Visoko, Bosnia and Herzegovina. It is located on the southern banks of the River Bosna.

Demographics 
According to the 2013 census, its population was 130.

References

Populated places in Visoko